This list contains the names of albums that contain a hidden track and also information on how to find them. Not all printings of an album contain the same track arrangements, so some copies of a particular album may not have the hidden track(s) listed below. Some of these tracks may be hidden in the pregap, and some hidden simply as a track following the listed tracks. The list is ordered by artist name using the surname where appropriate.

 Lacrimosa, Echos: "Durch Nacht und Flut" appears again after "Die Shreie sind verstummt", this time with the final refrain sung in Spanish. There is a long silence in between.
 Ladyhawke, Anxiety: "Human" appears after 45 seconds of silence following the last track "Gone Gone Gone".
 Laika, Sounds of the Satellites: Final track number 12 "Dirty Feet & Giggles" runs for 3.25 minutes, after which a gap of 15 minutes' silence elapses before, at 18.24, an untitled track appears: an old crackly vintage radio broadcast about the eponymous dog Laika on board the Russian orbiting satellite Sputnik 2. This continues up to 21.47 after which the track ends.
 Laïs: Dorothea, after "De Wanhoop" there is a hidden track with come studio chat and outtakes from recording sessions. Only on 1st press, on later presses "De Wanhoop" is not the last track and doesn't feature the hidden track.
 Lamb, Lamb: A remix by Fila Brazillia of Cotton Wool is hidden after a length of silence at the end of the final track, Feela.
 Fear of Fours: Instrumental version of Lullaby in the pregap.
 What Sound: Blessing in Disguise, a short piece of music played on electric piano appears after a period of silence after the final track.
 Best Kept Secrets: The Best of Lamb 1996–2004: Instrumental version of Wonder in the pregap.
 Lambretta: Breakfast: After the last track "And all the roses" the following occurs: 31s of silence, the doadoa-intro from the first track "Hello," 19s of metronome-ticking.
 Lano & Woodley, Lano & Woodley Sing Songs: After "Shed" concludes at 3:40, there is 33 seconds of silence, followed by an untitled hidden track starting at 4:13, which concludes at 5:12.
 Landecker & The Legends: "Special YDNA" - Club mix of track 3 "YDNA" which is a parody of Y.M.C.A. Hidden 12th track not listed on Landecker and the Legends: Volume Two.
 Langford, Jon & Skull Orchard: Skull Orchard CD after the final track, includes a special message from one of Jon's friends in Newport, in Wales, which is recited over an instrumental snippet from the album's first track, "Tubby Brothers."
 Late of the Pier: "Fantasy Black Channel": A hidden track, "No Time" plays a few seconds after the final track, "Bathroom Gurgle."
 Larrikin Love, The Freedom Spark: "It Explodes" is hidden in the pre-gap
 Laurie Berkner, Under a Shady Tree: A blooper for "Blow A Kiss" after the last song.
 Avril Lavigne, Goodbye Lullaby: An extended version of "Alice," a song Lavigne recorded for Tim Burton's 2010 film Alice in Wonderland, appears as a hidden track on the album. Even though the song appears on the track list on the back of the album, it is listed as a "hidden track." Digital versions of the album have a minute of silence after the previous track "Goodbye" before "Alice" starts.
 Lazlo Bane:
 11 Transistor: "Prada Wallet" after the last song.
 All the Time in the World: "It's Time For Us To Go" after the last song.
 Leaves - on album Breathe at the End of eleventh song "We" is hidden "Exit."
 Lee Press-on and the Nails:
 Jump Swing From Hell: Live at the Hi-Ball Lounge: "Jumpin' Jive" at the end of the album
 Swing Is Dead: "Jumpin' Jack Flash" at the end of the album
 Danny Leeds: Rock & Roll Rollercoaster: After "Mending Broken Wings," there is a slowed-down, acoustic version of the title track.
 Leeds United A.F.C.: Marching on Together: Leeds United Greatest Hits - Volume 2: Rob Robotica's version of "Leeds Leeds Leeds (Marching on Together)" is hidden shortly after the last track "White Xmas." Although it is hidden, it is listed as a bonus hidden track on the back cover.
 Leftfield, Leftism: Sometime after the last track is a BIG Booming sound said to be able to cause any amplifier or speaker to shake
 Leftöver Crack, Mediocre Generica: "Gay Rude Boys Unite," an instrumental at track 13
"Legally Blonde Original Broadway Cast Recording" and "Legally Blonde London Cast Recording": Both cast recordings feature a bonus track entitled "Kyle the Magnificent" following a pause at the end of the last track, "Find My Way/Finale".
 Legião Urbana, Como é Que Se Diz Eu te Amo: In the second disc "Metal Contra as Nuvens" can be found at 6:10 of final track after 30 seconds of silence.
 Legião Urbana, As Quatro Estações ao Vivo: In another live presentation, the band hid the track "Faroeste Caboclo" at the 16:51 mark of the final track, after 12 minutes and 17 seconds of silence.
 Adrian Legg: Waiting For a Dancer: "Norah Handley's Waltz" is accessible by rewinding track one, "Ragged Nail"
 Lemon Demon:
Dinosaurchestra: On the PC version of the commentary (which displayed text and played the album), seven minutes after "The Too Much Song," a twenty-six-second track about Turkeys plays.
 View-Monster: There is an unlisted track in the CD, hidden in several folders, titled "creepy"
 Nature Tapes: There is a hidden track called "Sexy DVD" hidden in the pre-gap.
 Les Savy Fav, The Cat and the Cobra: After the final track "Titan" is a live version of the song "Our Coastal Hymn"
 Less Than Jake: Losing Streak: Rewind to -1:23, before "This is Howard, the old dude..." in the beginning of the album.
 Levellers: On their self-titled album, after "Belaruse" there is a few minutes silence, followed by a mish-mash of sounds, including a weird version of "Time", formerly a B-side to "This Garden"
 Blake Lewis, A.D.D. (Audio Day Dream): After some of the songs on the album, there are hidden interludes that lead into the next track. The names of the interludes are in the booklet.
 Leona Lewis, Echo: 3 minutes after the final track "Lost Then Found" ends, there is a hidden track "Stone Hearts and Hand Grenades."
 La Ley, Uno: In "Al Final" track, at 7:35 the song "Once in a Lifetime" can be heard.
 The Libertines:
 The Libertines: "France" at 3:28 of final track "What Became of the Likely Lads"
 Up The Bracket: "Mockingbird" or "Mayday" at the end of the album, depending on version
 Liberty X, Being Somebody: "Where Do We Go From Here" after "Maybe" at the end of the album
 Lifer, Lifer (2001): The unlisted final track "Perfect" plays after a period of silence.
 Lil Scrappy : Bred 2 Die Born 2 Live: "Oh Yeah (Work)" featuring Sean P and E-40 right after "Lord Have Mercy" (featuring Eminem)
 Limp Bizkit:
 Three Dollar Bill, Yall$: "Faith" is followed by a hidden track titled "Stereotype Me".
 Significant Other: "Nookie" contains a hidden interlude; "I'm Broke" contains hidden messages on Fred Durst's answering machine. After "9 Teen 90 Nine" is a recording of Fred Durst's mother singing to him; after "N 2 Gether Now" is "Everyday"; after "Trust?" is a secret scratching session from DJ Lethal. After "Outro" are two hidden tracks: "Radio Sucks" by Matt Pinfield, and "Mind of Les" by Les Claypool. Track 16 is an untitled silent track.
 Chocolate Starfish and the Hot Dog Flavored Water: After "The One" is "Blow Me Away." "Boiler" contains a hidden interlude. Miscellaneous ramblings can be found at the end of "Outro," featuring the voice of actor Ben Stiller.
 Results May Vary: At the end of "Red Light - Green Light," a song called "Take It Home" plays. At the end of "Behind Blue Eyes," a song called "All That Easy" plays. Curiously, Spotify lists "all that easy" as a separate track on its parent album, instead of leaving it as a hidden track.
 Linkin Park:
 Hybrid Theory EP: A hidden rap interlude can be found on the track titled "And One." This interlude is about 1-minute long. There is also a second hidden track that track can be found at 10 minutes on the last track (titled "Part of Me"). This hidden track, referred to as "Ambient", is similar to the instrumental "Session" which can be found on Meteora and is often referred to as track 7. (Note: the band was still called Hybrid Theory at this time.)
 Frat Party at the Pankake Festival: There are five hidden tracks on the release, one of these being "One Step Closer" (Humble Brothers Remix). To hear this audio-only remix, watch "One Step Closer" from the chapter selection. Continue watching until the final time "Shut up" is shouted. When this final shout is on, the button 'enter' could be pressed to reveal the Humble Brothers Remix of the song.
 Link 80: "17 Reasons": A hidden cover of the Misfits song, "Who Killed Marilyn" several minutes after the last track.
 Lisa Left Eye Lopes: "Supernova". The album track listing lists only twelve tracks but a thirteenth track is mixed into the ending of track twelve, thus there is no gap between the songs.
 Lit: "A Place in the Sun": If you rewind from the first track a hidden track can be heard after a minute or two.
 Little Boots, Hands: The title track Hands can be heard after "No Brakes."
 Live:
 Throwing Copper: "Horse" appears on track 14.
 V: A remix of "Deep Enough" appears on track 15.
 Living Colour, The Chair in the Doorway: The track Asshole appears after 4 minutes, 33 seconds of silence at the end of the album.
 LL Cool J, Radio: Untitled hidden track in between "Dangerous" and "Rock the Bells."
 Lodestar, Lodestar: Untitled track at the end of the album
 London After Midnight, Psycho Magnet: "99" after 86 unlisted tracks of silence there is one hidden track at the end of the album.
 Lord Belial, Enter the Moonlight Gate: Untitled track at the end of "Realm of a Thousand Burning Souls (Part 1)"
 Los Olvidados: El Cine: Hidden brief song after about one minute of silence at the end of Luz al Cielo.
 Lost Ocean, Lost Ocean: Hidden track containing bridge from "Believe" after (approximately) one minute ten seconds of silence.* 
 Lovespirals, Windblown Kiss: Hidden track, titled "Old Kazoo Blues," appears at the 6:53 of the final album track, "I Can't See You."
 Lyle Lovett, The Road to Ensenada: "The Girl in the Corner" is hidden at the end of track 12, following several minutes of silence.
 Lucky Boys Confusion, "Throwing the Game (album)": The final track "Slip" leads into the hidden track "Perfect", beginning at 3:47. 
 Ludacris, Word of Mouf: Jermaine Dupri's and Ludacris's "Welcome To Atlanta" appears right after the last track on the album, "Block Lockdown."
 Ludo:
 You're Awful, I Love You: At the end of "In Space", another song called "The Boat Song" plays.
 You're Awful, I Love You: If you rewind the first track, Love Me Dead there is a hidden track called "Goodbye Bear."
Luscious Jackson, Natural Ingredients: Between "Here" and "Find Your Mind", there is a 14-second-long hidden track called "Intermission". It is sounds of a needle being put on a record, and a woman saying, "Now, ladies and gentlemen, get ready for side two." It is listed on most copies, though.
 Jeff Lynne: "Armchair Theatre": An unusual whirring sound and seagull cawing is heard after 17 seconds of silence following track 11, "Save Me Now." After this is 12 seconds of silence, followed by Jeff Lynne saying "Hey, it's still going y'know," and chimes ringing. Those hidden tracks are preserved on a 2013 reissue of the album, though they are placed after the reissue's final track "Forecast."

See also
 List of backmasked messages
 List of albums with tracks hidden in the pregap

References 

L